The Holy Resurrection Church in Belkofski, Alaska is a historic Russian Orthodox church.

It is significant as "a striking example of a special type of Russian Orthodox Church architectural heritage", with a pyramidal-shaped roof over a central tower, in a design following from the 1732 design of the Church of the Resurrection on the Moskva River at Kolomenskoye, near Moscow, Russia.  It is believed that there has been a church at this site since 1881; the current church may be a reconstruction.

The church's design influenced the design of the later, 1888, Russian Orthodox church at Karluk and also of the 1906 Russian Orthodox church at Ouzinkie.

It was added to the National Register of Historic Places in 1980.

Gradually the residents of Belkofski moved to nearby villages which offered them new economic opportunities. The church's rich inventory, including a beautiful iconostasis containing numerous icons from Russia, was transferred to King Cove, twelve miles away by boat, where a new Orthodox church was built in the 1980s.

See also
National Register of Historic Places listings in Aleutians East Borough, Alaska

References

Buildings and structures on the National Register of Historic Places in Aleutians East Borough, Alaska
Churches on the National Register of Historic Places in Alaska
Russian Orthodox church buildings in Alaska